White Trash Blues is the tenth studio album and a cover album by English rock band the Quireboys, released on 5 September 2017. The album is a set of covers of blues classics from artists such as Muddy Waters, John Lee Hooker and Chuck Berry.

Reception
The album has received mostly positive to mixed reviews.

Track listing
 Cross Eyed Cat 
 Boom Boom 
 I Wish You Would
 Take Out Some Insurance 
 Going Down 
 Help Me
 Shame Shame Shame
 I'm Your Hoochie Coochie Man 
 Leaving Trunk 
 I'm a King Bee
 Walking the Dog 
 Little Queenie

Charts

Personnel
 Jonathan "Spike" Gray – lead vocals
 Guy Griffin – lead guitar, rhythm guitar, backing vocals
 Paul Guerin – lead guitar, rhythm guitar, backing vocals
 Keith Weir – keyboards, backing vocals
 Dave McCluskey – drums
 Nick Malling – bass guitar

References

2017 albums
The Quireboys albums